Domeyko Airfield is a public use airport located near Domeyko, Atacama, Chile.

See also
List of airports in Chile

References

External links 
 Airport record for Domeyko Airfield at Landings.com

Airports in Atacama Region